In mathematics, conformal welding (sewing or gluing) is a process in geometric function theory for producing a Riemann surface by joining together two Riemann surfaces, each with a disk removed, along their boundary circles. This problem can be reduced to that of finding univalent holomorphic maps f, g of the unit disk and its complement into the extended complex plane, both admitting continuous extensions to the closure of their domains, such that the images are complementary Jordan domains and such that on the unit circle they differ by a given quasisymmetric homeomorphism. Several proofs are known using a variety of techniques, including the Beltrami equation, the Hilbert transform on the circle and elementary approximation techniques.  describe the first two methods of conformal welding as well as providing numerical computations and applications to the analysis of shapes in the plane.

Welding using the Beltrami equation

If f is a diffeomorphism of the circle, the Alexander extension gives a way of extending f to a diffeomorphism of the unit disk D:

where ψ is a smooth function with values in [0,1], equal to 0 near 0 and 1 near 1, and

with g(θ + 2π) = g(θ) + 2π.

The extension F can be continued to any larger disk |z| < R with R > 1. Accordingly in the unit disc

Now extend μ to a Beltrami coefficient on the whole of C by setting it equal to 0 for |z| ≥ 1. Let G be the corresponding solution of the Beltrami equation:

Let F1(z) = G ∘ F−1(z) for |z| ≤ 1 and
F2(z) = G (z) for |z| ≥ 1. Thus F1 and F2 are univalent holomorphic maps of |z| < 1 and |z| > 1 onto the inside and outside of a Jordan curve. They extend continuously to homeomorphisms fi of the unit circle onto the Jordan curve on the boundary. By construction they satisfy the
conformal welding condition:

Welding using the Hilbert transform on the circle
The use of the Hilbert transform to establish conformal welding was first suggested by the Georgian mathematicians D.G. Mandzhavidze and B.V. Khvedelidze in 1958. A detailed account was given at the same time by F.D. Gakhov and presented in his classic monograph.

Let en(θ) = einθ be the standard orthonormal basis of L2(T). Let H2(T) be Hardy space, the closed subspace spanned by the en with n ≥ 0. Let P be the orthogonal projection onto Hardy space and set T = 2P - I. The operator H = iT is the Hilbert transform on the circle and can be written as a singular integral operator.

Given a diffeomorphism f of the unit circle, the task is to determine two univalent holomorphic functions

defined in |z| < 1 and |z| > 1 and both extending smoothly to the unit circle, mapping onto a Jordan domain and its complement, such that

Let F be the restriction of f+ to the unit circle. Then

and

Hence

If V(f) denotes the bounded invertible operator on L2 induced by the diffeomorphism f, then the operator

is compact, indeed it is given by an operator with smooth kernel because P and T are given by singular integral operators. The equation above then reduces to

The operator I − Kf is a Fredholm operator of index zero. It has zero kernel and is therefore invertible. 
In fact an element in the kernel would consist of a pair of holomorphic functions on D and Dc which have smooth boundary values on the circle related by f. Since the holomorphic function on Dc vanishes at ∞, the positive powers of this pair also provide solutions, which are linearly independent, contradicting the fact that I − Kf is a Fredholm operator. The above equation therefore has a unique solution F which is smooth and from which f± can be reconstructed by reversing the steps above. Indeed, by looking at the equation satisfied by the logarithm of the derivative of F, it follows that F has nowhere vanishing derivative on the unit circle. Moreover F is one-to-one on the circle since if it assumes the value a at different points z1 and z2 then the logarithm of R(z) = (F(z) − a)/(z - z1)(z − z2) would satisfy an integral equation known to have no non-zero solutions. Given these properties on the unit circle, the required properties of f± then follow from the argument principle.

Notes

References

Theorems in analysis
Complex analysis
Riemann surfaces